Michael Anthony Mitchell (January 1, 1956 – June 9, 2011) was an American professional basketball player in the National Basketball Association (NBA), over eleven seasons, from 1978 to 1990.

College career
Mitchell, who was born in Atlanta, played college basketball at Auburn University.  While at Auburn, Mitchell was a four-time All-SEC selection and was named a second-team All-American in his 1977–78 season.  He also became Auburn's all-time leader in scoring (2,123 points) and rebounding (996), after leaving for the NBA.  He remains the all-time leading rebounder and is second in all-time scoring only to Chuck Person.  Mitchell's number 30 jersey was retired on January 19, 2013, at the Auburn Arena.

Professional career
Mitchell was drafted with the 15th pick in the first round, of the 1978 NBA Draft, by the Cleveland Cavaliers.  He started his NBA career with the Cavaliers but played most of his career for the San Antonio Spurs. Mitchell was a 6'7" and 234 lb. small forward, with career averages of 19.8 points per game, 5.6 rebounds per game, 1.3 assists per game, a .493 field goal percentage, and a .779 free throw percentage. He was known for his mid-range jumpshot and ability to play well under pressure in the postseason.

Mitchell was an All-Star in 1981 and was in the top ten in scoring four times, and the top ten in minutes played three times. During the 1983 NBA Playoffs, Mitchell and the Spurs reached the Western Conference Finals, where Mitchell led the Spurs in scoring with 25.7 points a game, while adding 10.3 rebounds a game, as the Spurs were eliminated by the Los Angeles Lakers in six games. Among other career highlights, he led the Spurs in scoring for the 1984–1985 season, which marked the only season in which George Gervin played on the Spurs and did not lead the team in scoring over an entire year. Mitchell averaged 22.2 points per game, to Gervin's 21.2 per game.

Mitchell averaged 19.8 points per game over the course of his NBA career. His 9,799 total points scored for the San Antonio Spurs is seventh highest in franchise history, behind Gervin, Tim Duncan, David Robinson, Tony Parker, James Silas, and Manu Ginóbili.

From 1988, until a short return to the Spurs during the 1990 playoffs, Mitchell played in Italy, with Basket Brescia. He also played in Italy with Basket Napoli, before leaving for the Israeli side Maccabi Tel Aviv, in 1991. From 1992, until his retirement in 1999, Mitchell played for another Italian club, Pallacanestro Reggiana.

Post-playing career
Mitchell later worked as a counselor for at-risk youth, in San Antonio.

Death
Mitchell died of cancer in 2011.

NBA career statistics

Regular season 

|-
| style="text-align:left;"| 
| style="text-align:left;"|Cleveland
| 80 || – || 19.7 || .513 || – || .736 || 4.1 || .8 || .6 || .4 || 10.7
|-
| style="text-align:left;"| 
| style="text-align:left;"|Cleveland
| 82 || – || 34.2 || .523 || .000 || .787 || 7.2 || 1.1 || .9 || .9 || 22.2
|-
| style="text-align:left;"| 
| style="text-align:left;"|Cleveland
| 82 || – || 39.0 || .476 || .444 || .784 || 6.1 || 1.7 || .8 || .6 || 24.5
|-
| style="text-align:left;"| 
| style="text-align:left;"|Cleveland
| 27 || 26 || 36.0 || .454 || .000 || .720 || 5.2 || 1.4 || 1.0 || .6 || 19.6
|-
| style="text-align:left;"| 
| style="text-align:left;"|San Antonio
| 57 || 57 || 36.7 || .539 || .000 || .733 || 7.9 || .8 || .6 || .5 || 21.0
|-
| style="text-align:left;"| 
| style="text-align:left;"|San Antonio
| 80 || 79 || 35.0 || .511 || .000 || .758 || 6.7 || 1.2 || .7 || .7 || 19.9
|-
| style="text-align:left;"| 
| style="text-align:left;"|San Antonio
| 79 || 79 || 36.1 || .488 || .429 || .779 || 7.2 || 1.2 || .8 || .9 || 23.3
|-
| style="text-align:left;"| 
| style="text-align:left;"|San Antonio
| 82 || 82 || 34.8 || .497 || .217 || .777 || 5.1 || 1.8 || .7 || .3 || 22.2
|-
| style="text-align:left;"| 
| style="text-align:left;"|San Antonio
| 82 || 82 || 36.2 || .473 || .000 || .809 || 5.0 || 2.3 || .7 || .3 || 23.4
|-
| style="text-align:left;"| 
| style="text-align:left;"|San Antonio
| 40 || 18 || 23.1 || .435 || .500 || .821 || 2.6 || 1.0 || .5 || .2 || 12.7
|-
| style="text-align:left;"| 
| style="text-align:left;"|San Antonio
| 68 || 20 || 22.1 || .482 || .250 || .825 || 2.9 || 1.0 || .5 || .2 || 13.5
|- class="sortbottom"
| style="text-align:center;" colspan="2"| Career
| 759 || 443 || 32.3 || .493 || .216 || .779 || 5.6 || 1.3 || .7 || .5 || 19.8
|- class="sortbottom"
| style="text-align:center;" colspan="2"| All-Star
| 1 || 0 || 15.0 || .500 || – || 1.000 || 4.0 || 2.0 || 1.0 || .0 || 14.0

Playoffs 

|-
|style="text-align:left;"|1982
|style="text-align:left;"|San Antonio
|9||–||40.6||.533||–||.754||8.1||.8||.6||.1||24.8
|-
|style="text-align:left;"|1983
|style="text-align:left;"|San Antonio
|11||–||38.4||.510||.500||.758||9.5||1.1||.6||1.7||20.9
|-
|style="text-align:left;"|1985
|style="text-align:left;"|San Antonio
|5||5||36.0||.564||.000||.875||3.8||2.4||.6||.8||21.8
|-
|style="text-align:left;"|1986
|style="text-align:left;"|San Antonio
|3||3||35.7||.404||–||.500||3.0||3.3||1.0||1.0||15.7
|-
|style="text-align:left;"|1988
|style="text-align:left;"|San Antonio
|3||3||24.7||.351||–||.833||5.0||1.3||.3||.3||10.3
|-
|style="text-align:left;"|1990
|style="text-align:left;"|San Antonio
|4||0||3.8||.375||–||–||.8||.5||.0||.0||1.5
|- class="sortbottom"
| style="text-align:center;" colspan="2"| Career
| 35 || 11 || 33.2 || .502 || .333 || .762 || 6.4 || 1.3 || .5 || .8 || 18.5

References

External links
 Mike Mitchell page at basketball-reference.com
 FIBA EuroLeague Profile
 Lega Basket Serie A Profile & Stats 

1956 births
2011 deaths
African-American basketball players
American expatriate basketball people in Israel
American expatriate basketball people in Italy
American men's basketball players
Auburn Tigers men's basketball players
Basket Brescia Leonessa players
Basket Napoli players
Basketball players from Atlanta
Cleveland Cavaliers draft picks
Cleveland Cavaliers players
Deaths from cancer in Texas
Lega Basket Serie A players
Maccabi Tel Aviv B.C. players
National Basketball Association All-Stars
Pallacanestro Reggiana players
Parade High School All-Americans (boys' basketball)
San Antonio Spurs players
Small forwards
20th-century African-American sportspeople
21st-century African-American people